CSS Suxxx is an EP released by CSS on the Trama label on October 29, 2005. It was sold only at gigs in Brazil and the United States.

Track listing
 "CSS SUXXX" (Adriano Cintra/Lovefoxxx) - 1:57
 "Patins" (Adriano Cintra/Luiza Sá/Lovefoxxx) - 2:19
 "Party Animal" (Adriano Cintra/Ana Rezende/Lovefoxxx) - 2:27
 "Fuck Off Rock" (Adriano Cintra/Lovefoxxx)
 "Meeting Paris Hilton" (Adriano Cintra/Lovefoxxx) - 3:11
 "Art Bitch" (Adriano Cintra/Lovefoxxx) - 3:09
 "Ódio Ódio Ódio, Sorry C." (Adriano Cintra/Lovefoxxx) - 2:50

References

CSS (band) EPs
2005 EPs